The men's 10 metre platform, also reported as plongeons de haut vol variés (English: varied high diving), was one of five diving events on the diving at the 1924 Summer Olympics programme. The competition was actually held from both 10 metre and 5 metre platforms. Divers performed four compulsory dives - standing inward plain dive, standing backward dive with twist, running forward somersault dive and running reverse somersault dive (5 metre platform) - and four dives of the competitor's choice for a total of eight dives. The competition was held on Saturday, 19 July 1924, and Sunday, 20 July 1924. Twenty divers from ten nations competed.

Results

First round

The three divers who scored the smallest number of points in each group of the first round advanced to the final.

Group 1

Group 2

Group 3

Final

References

Sources
 
 

Men
1924
Men's events at the 1924 Summer Olympics